Alan Jeffrey Goodall (born 2 December 1981) is an English former professional footballer who played as a defender.

During his career, he has played. for clubs including Bangor City, Rochdale, Luton Town, Chesterfield, Newport County, Stockport County, Grimsby Town and Aberystwyth Town

Career
Born in Birkenhead, Merseyside, Goodall started by playing for Poulton Victoria in Wallasey and then joined League of Wales club Bangor City in the summer of 2001. In his first season at the Farrar Road club, he played in the Welsh Cup final picking up a runners-up medal in the defeat against Barry Town at Park Avenue, Aberystwyth.

He was part of the team that lost narrowly in the 2002–03 UEFA Cup against FK Sartid and 2003–04 UEFA Intertoto Cup losing to Gloria Bistriţa. In 91 League of Wales appearances for City, Goodall scored ten goals. Towards the end of the 2003–04 season, he spent time on trial at Wrexham A.F.C., before joining Rochdale in the summer of 2004.

At the end of the 2005–06 season, Goodall's second at Spotland, he had made 74 League Two appearances scoring five times. In June 2007 Goodall signed for recently relegated League One side Luton Town on a two-year contract. He then scored on his debut in a 2–1 victory over Hartlepool United.

Goodall signed for Chesterfield on a two-year contract in August 2008 following his release from Luton Town. He scored his first goal for the club on 6 September 2008, with a 94th-minute winner against Rotherham United at Saltergate. On 31 July 2010 he rejoined Rochdale on a six-month contract. On 4 November 2010 he joined Blue Square Bet Premier side Newport County on loan and returned to Rochdale in January 2011. On 31 January 2011 he joined League 2 side Stockport County making his debut for the club on 5 February against Torquay United.

In May 2011 he was informed that he would not be offered a contract by the club for the 2011/12 season.

In Summer 2011 he joined Fleetwood Town. On 2 September 2013 he joined Grimsby Town, on a one-month loan. He returned to Fleetwood on 9 October 2013 due to sustaining an injury during Grimsby's 0–3 away win at Aldershot Town the previous Saturday.

On 15 July 2014 he signed for Morecambe F.C on a free transfer due to his release from Fleetwood Town F.C. He will wear the number 13 shirt for the Shrimps. As of 16 July 2014, the length of the contract had not yet been released publicly.

In 2016, Goodall joined Altrincham of the National League North. He made nineteen league appearances during the season, which concluded with relegation from the National League. He briefly served as joint caretaker manager of the club and in April 2017, having suffered a long-term injury, announced his retirement from playing at the age of 35.

In August 2018, Goodall came out of retirement and signed for Welsh Premier League club Aberystwyth Town.
After making 23 appearances for the West Wales club, Goodall left Aberystwyth Town in early 2019.

Honours
 Welsh Premier League Team of the Year: 2003–04

References

External links

Alan Goodall at welsh-premier.com

1981 births
Sportspeople from Birkenhead
Living people
English footballers
Association football defenders
Bangor City F.C. players
Rochdale A.F.C. players
Luton Town F.C. players
Chesterfield F.C. players
Newport County A.F.C. players
Stockport County F.C. players
Fleetwood Town F.C. players
Grimsby Town F.C. players
Cymru Premier players
English Football League players
National League (English football) players
Morecambe F.C. players
Aberystwyth Town F.C. players
Altrincham F.C. players